Ptycholomoides is a genus of moths in the tribe Archipini.

Species
Ptycholomoides aeriferana (Herrich-Schäffer, 1851)

References

 , 1954, Tijdschr. Ent. 97: 186.
 , 2005, World Catalogue of Insects 5.

External links
tortricidae.com

Archipini
Tortricidae genera